Zinc phosphodiesterase ELAC protein 1 is an enzyme that in humans is encoded by the ELAC1 gene.

References

Further reading